Kewa acida is one of the eight species currently recognized in the genus Kewa, the sole genus in the family Kewaceae. It is a bushy grey-leaved annual or short-lived perennial plant, with white flowers, endemic to St Helena, where it has been called the "salad plant". It is regarded as Critically Endangered. The succulent leaves are high in Vitamin C and were used by sailors in the past as a scurvy preventative.

Description
It has a spreading, bush-like habit, with stems that may be woody at the base. The flower has five tepals arranged in a single whorl. Characteristic of the genus Kewa, the outer two appear to be sepals, being green; one appears to be half sepal and half petal; and the inner two appear to be petals, being white with a green stripe on the back. The stamens are arranged in two whorls: ten paired in one whorl alternating with five single in the other. The ovary is superior (visible inside the tepals). The fruit is yellowish-brown, dehiscent, containing small black seeds.

Taxonomy
Kewa acida was first described by Joseph Dalton Hooker in 1868, as Pharnaceum acidum. In 1908, Konrad Müller transferred it to the genus Hypertelis, as H. acida. Müller placed Hypertelis in the family Aizoaceae, but it was subsequently placed in Molluginaceae. Molecular phylogenetic studies in the 21st century showed that most of the species placed in Hypertelis did not belong there, and in 2014 a new genus, Kewa, was established for eight species, including K. acida.

Distribution, habitat and conservation
Kewa acida is endemic to the mid-Atlantic island of St Helena. It tends to be annual and hence smaller in drier areas, but can become perennial and shrubby where there is more moisture.

It is threatened by introduced animals, such as mice and rabbits, which eat the highly palatable leaves, and also by competition from introduced plants. Efforts have been made to exclude grazing animals. Seeds are stored at the Millennium Seed Bank, Kew.

Uses
On St Helena, Kewa acida has been called the "salad plant". Its leaves have a salty acid taste and are high in vitamin C, so were used by sailors to prevent scurvy.

Cultivation
Kewa acida is in cultivation at Kew Gardens, originating from seeds collected in 2009. It can be propagated by seeds or by cuttings.

References

Caryophyllales
Flora of Saint Helena
Plants described in 1868